Gayndah Airport  is located near Gayndah, Queensland, Australia.

See also
 List of airports in Queensland

References

Airports in Queensland